On the Level is a lost 1917 American silent Western film directed by George Melford and written by Marion Fairfax and Charles Kenyon. The film stars Fannie Ward, Jack Dean, Harrison Ford, Lottie Pickford, James Cruze, and Jim Mason. The film was released on September 10, 1917, by Paramount Pictures.

Plot
As described in a film magazine, Merlin (Ward), the only daughter of a sheep rancher, is kidnapped by Sontag (Dean), who shoots her father and drives off the sheep. She is compelled to dance nightly in Sontag's saloon where she is known as Mexicali Mae. There she meets Joe Blanchard (Ford), a derelict from the east who plays the piano in order to secure enough dope to satisfy his craving. Sontag, fearing that one of his confederates has double crossed him and told about his opium smuggling operations, kills the man and places the blame on Joe. Merlin helps Joe escape, and they take up a ranch where Joe finally overcomes his desire for drugs. Joe's mother (Chapman) and fiancee (Pickford) pay a visit and Mrs. Chapman tries to buy off Merlin and have Joe return east. Merlin returns to Sontag's dance hall, and Joe follows, convinced that she no longer loves him. Merlin returns to the ranch and is about to end her own life when Joe and Sontag arrive. In the tussle that follows, Sontag is killed and Joe realizes that Merlin really loves him.

Cast 
 Fannie Ward as Merlin Warner
 Jack Dean as Pete Sontag
 Harrison Ford as Joe Blanchard
 Lottie Pickford as Eleanore Duke
 James Cruze as Ozmun
 Jim Mason as Pike 
 James Neill as Warner
 Edythe Chapman as Joe Blanchard's Mother
 Jane Wolfe as Sontag's Wife
 Henry Woodward as Judge Wilton

Reception
Like many American films of the time, On the Level was subject to cuts by city and state film censorship boards. The Chicago Board of Censors required a cut of the scene of a roulette wheel, man shooting girl's father, the intertitle "A little this side of hell", all tough dance scenes, tough dancing, two views of roulette wheel, flash first dead body scene and cut two others, flash scene of dragging body across floor, body in wheel barrow, three intertitles "I'm going to town, I'd rather die with morphine than without it", "You didn't say anything to your mother about me?", and "I understand", two tough dancing scenes, all scenes of selling liquor to sailor, two scenes of drinking at table in background, and girl on table with arms above man's neck.

References

External links 

 

1917 films
1917 Western (genre) films
1910s English-language films
Paramount Pictures films
Films directed by George Melford
American black-and-white films
Lost Western (genre) films
Lost American films
1917 lost films
Silent American Western (genre) films
1910s American films